The Freedom and Direct Democracy (SPD) leadership election of 2018 was held on 14 July 2018. Tomio Okamura was elected for second term.

Background
Tomio Okamura founded the party in 2015 after he split from Dawn. He was elected party's leader the same year. Okamura led the party during 2017 legislative election. It received 10.6% of votes and came fourth.

New leadership election was scheduled for 14 July 2018. Tomio Okamura announced he will seek reelection. No other candidate was announced. It was reported that candidates might be announced on the day of election.

Voting
Leader is elected by 162 delegates. 140 of them are nominated by regional organisations while remaining 22 are party's MPs.

152 delegates eventually participated. Okamura received 150 votes and thus was reelected. Okamura thanked delegates for a strong mandate. Okamura himself didn't vote in the election. Only one delegate voted against him. Okamura's term will expire in 2021.

References

Freedom and Direct Democracy leadership elections
Freedom and Direct Democracy leadership election
Freedom and Direct Democracy leadership election
Freedom and Direct Democracy leadership election